Chestnut is a surname. Notable people with the surname include:

 Ashlei Sharpe Chestnut, American actress 
 Ben Chestnut, American billionaire tech executive
 Charles S. Chestnut IV (born 1962), American politician
 Cynthia M. Chestnut (born 1949), American politician
 Cyrus Chestnut (born 1963), American jazz pianist, composer and producer
 Harold Chestnut (1917–2001), American electrical engineer, control engineer and manager at General Electric and author
 J. L. Chestnut Jr. (1930–2008), African-American attorney and civil rights activist
 Jacob Chestnut (1940–1998), one of two Capitol police officers killed in the U.S. Capitol shooting incident
 Jennings Chestnut, American luthier
 Joey Chestnut (born 1983), American competitive eater
 Julius Chestnut (born 2000), American football player
 Morris Chestnut (born 1969), American film and television actor
 Randy Chestnut (born 1971), American comedian
 Johnson Chesnut Whittaker (1858–1931), American, one of the first black men to win an appointment to the United States Military Academy at West Point

See also
 Chesnut (surname)
 Chesnutt